Andriamanjato is a surname. Notable people with the surname include:

Ny Hasina Andriamanjato, Malagasy politician, son of Richard
Richard Andriamanjato (1930–2013), Malagasy politician